Gianluca Esposito (born 7 March 1995) is an Italian professional footballer who plays as a midfielder for  club A.C. Renate.

Club career
Born in Naples, Esposito made his senior debut for Savoia on 2013–14 season. Savoia won the promotion that year, and the midfileder made his Serie C debut on 11 October 2014 against Salernitana. In December 2014, he joined Agropoli on loan.

After left Savoia in 2015, he played for many Serie C teams like:Rimini, Juve Stabia, Sicula Leonzio, Fermana, Cavese and Ravenna.

On 30 August 2021, he signed with Renate.

References

External links
 
 

1995 births
Living people
Footballers from Naples
Italian footballers
Association football midfielders
Serie C players
Serie D players
U.S. Savoia 1908 players
U.S. Agropoli 1921 players
Rimini F.C. 1912 players
S.S. Juve Stabia players
A.S.D. Sicula Leonzio players
Fermana F.C. players
Cavese 1919 players
Ravenna F.C. players
A.C. Renate players